Ay (Äy) is a rural locality (a village) in Alegazovsky Selsoviet, Mechetlinsky District, Bashkortostan, Russia. The population was 33 as of 2010. There is 1 street.

Geography 
Ay is located 12 km northwest of Bolsheustyikinskoye (the district's administrative centre) by road. Alegazovo is the nearest rural locality.

References 

Rural localities in Mechetlinsky District